Hacked is a 2020 Indian psychological thriller film directed by Vikram Bhatt ScreenPlay Writer Govind Bhana and produced by Krishna Bhatt, Amar Thakkar and Jatin Sethi under their banner Loneranger Productions. The film stars Hina Khan, Rohan Shah & Mohit Malhotra in lead roles and Sid Makkar in a supporting role. The story revolves about a boy's love for an older girl and how it turns into an obsession By Hacking her Life

Principal photography commenced in August 2019. The film was theatrically released in India on 7 February 2020.

Post theatrical release, it released digitally on Zee5 app, trended for consecutive 4 months and fetched millions of views.

Plot
Sameera "Sam" Khanna works at a magazine company; she has a neighbor, a 19-years old cute and innocent looking hacker Vivek Tiwari who has a crush on her. Sam has a fragile and intimate relationship with her boyfriend, a film actor named Om Kapoor, as he reciprocates feelings whenever he likes. On Sam's birthday party at her apartment where all her friends and colleagues are invited, she is broken when Om doesn't attend the party. Vivek helps clean her flat, and Sam suddenly breaks down and reveals everything about her and Om's relationship to Vivek in a drunken state. Vivek tries to console her, and in the process, Sam kisses him. Vivek then reciprocates, and they have passionate sex. The next morning, Sam wakes up and is shocked to see Vivek sleeping next to her. Om rings the doorbell, and Sam gets worried. Vivek says it's okay, to which Sam says she will talk to him later.

Sam is still thinking about the previous night in the office meeting, to which her boss shouts at her for being absent-minded in the forum. Vivek, who is outside, hears this and, in response, gets food for Sam and sends everyone else for lunch. Sam is disturbed and warns Vivek that whatever happened the previous night was a mistake, and warns him from interfering in her personal life. The next day, however, Sam sees that she cannot enter her office when her boss informs her that some personal files of the company have been hacked from her laptop. Confused, Sam receives a call from Vivek, who reveals that he hacked Sam's laptop and leaked the company's files to teach Sam's boss a lesson. Vivek had previously hacked into the police records and uploaded a mobile vendor's name as most wanted because he refused to repair Sam's phone. Sam calls Vivek to a cafe and asks him to revert what he has done. Vivek reveals that he loves her and can do anything for her, in response to which Sam slaps him in front of everyone and warns him to stay away from her. Vivek gets enraged at the incident. He makes the tech experts at Sam's company believe that Sam leaked the files, which gets her fired. Om takes Sam to vacation in Goa for Sam to be relaxed again. Vivek captures images of Sam and Om getting intimate and leaks them on to the internet. Om publicly denies their relationship, which leaves Sam heartbroken. Sam agrees to remove the life support of her dying mother as she had no chance of living. Along with her neighbor Rohan Mehra, she then lodges a complaint against Vivek for his activities.

The police arrest Vivek in front of his grandmother. He is then sent for interrogation, but in the process, threatens a police officer by hacking into his phone and tells him he will reveal the secret of his adultery to his wife. The officer is forced to leave Vivek, who later hacks Sam's Facebook (or Facelook as per the pronunciation in the film), Instagram (or Insta-frame as per the pronunciation in the film) and Twitter account(s) and put on a post saying that her life is not going well and she is depressed. Enraged, Rohan goes over to Vivek's house and beats him up. In the series of incidents that follow, Sam finds out that Rohan was her childhood friend. Sam feels suspicious about Vivek's maid as she has an expensive Yves Saint Laurent bag and also knew that Vivek was not rich enough to buy that bag. Sam encounters the maid, Riya, who explains to Sam that Vivek is actually a shameless and cruel person who used to stalk her, and when she rejected his love, Vivek threatened to release some of her secrets on the internet, which could ruin her life. Vivek forced Riya to come to his house to work as a maid so that no one would feel suspicious. She also says that he had ruined a Sheetal's life like this, which caused her to commit suicide and make Vivek drop out of college.

Vivek kills his grandmother after she threatens him with exposing his true nature because he dropped out of college and has been lying to his family for months. In the end, Sam manages to make a plan and takes revenge by killing him just after he wipes all the evidence which would prove that Sam was with him. With no evidence to prove who killed Vivek, the case is closed. Sam is shown walking out of the office with Rohan, seemingly indicating that Sam has started a new life.

Cast 
 Hina Khan as Sameera Khanna aka Sam
 Rohan Shah as Vivek Tiwari : Sam's Hacker
 Sid Makkar as Om Kapoor : Sam's ex Boyfriend
 Mohit Malhotra as Rohan Mehra : Sam's Childhood Friend
 Pravina Deshpande as Mrs. Tiwari (Vivek's grandmother)
 Sheetal Dabholkar as Nandini Sahai (Sam's boss)
 Garrvil Mohan as Dr. Ravi Sinha
 Tanvi Thakkar as Ria (Vivek's fake maid)

Music 

The film's music is composed by Arko, Jeet Gannguli, Chirantan Bhatt, Sunny and Inder Bawra and Amjad Nadeem Aamir, with lyrics written by Arko, Amjad Nadeem, Shakeel Azmi, Manoj Yadav and Kumaar.

Release
The film was theatrically released in India on 7 February 2020.

References

External links 
 

2020s Hindi-language films
2020 psychological thriller films
Indian psychological thriller films
Films scored by Jeet Ganguly
Films scored by Arko Pravo Mukherjee
Films scored by Amjad Nadeem
Films scored by Chirantan Bhatt
Techno-thriller films